The Mahned Bridge was constructed in 1903 and spans the Leaf River in Perry County, Mississippi. Around 1980, the bridge was removed from service and access was terminated.  The bridge was declared a Mississippi Landmark in 1996 and was added to the National Register of Historic Places in 1997.

History
The Mahned Bridge was constructed by the Chicago Bridge & Iron Company as a prefabricated, one lane, iron truss structure.  Completed in 1903, the bridge was one of the first to span the Leaf River in south Mississippi.  The bridge derives its name from the nearby rural community of Mahned.

Description
Two iron trusses, Camelback and Pratt, comprise the main structure and are positioned on metal caissons filled with concrete.

Notoriety
The remote location of Mahned Bridge, several miles from the small town of New Augusta, made it a favorite gathering spot among college and high school students for star gazing and other activities. In September 1993, the vehicle of Angela Freeman, age 17, was found abandoned at Mahned Bridge.  Freeman was missing, and the investigation into her disappearance was never solved.

In May 1995, the north end of Mahned Bridge was determined to be the scene of the abduction and murder of William Hatcher, age 27, and Robbie Bond, age 21.  The suspect in the Hatcher and Bond murders was subsequently convicted.

References

Bridges completed in 1903
Road bridges on the National Register of Historic Places in Mississippi
Mississippi Landmarks
National Register of Historic Places in Perry County, Mississippi
Iron bridges in the United States
Pratt truss bridges in the United States